DIA (shortened from DIAMOND and backronym for Do It Amazing) is a South Korean girl group formed by MBK Entertainment. The group is currently composed of six members: Eunice, Jueun, Huihyeon, Yebin, Chaeyeon and Eunchae. DIA officially debuted on September 14, 2015, with their lead single "Somehow" from debut album Do It Amazing.

Seunghee left the group in April 2016 to focus on acting. Eunjin decided to leave the group In May 2018 to focus on her health. Jenny also left the group in July 2019 for health issues. Somyi departed the group in January 2022 after deciding to terminate her exclusive contract. The group is currently on indefinite hiatus to focus on their solo activities.

 History 

 2015: Do It Amazing 
In February 2015, MBK Entertainment announced its plans to debut a new girl group. Originally, the company had decided to have possible candidates for their new group compete on a reality survival program. On February 10, Kim Dani was confirmed to be joining the project and announced the program's name T-ara's Little Sister Girl Group. In June, MBK Entertainment announced that they had cancelled their plans for a survival program, and decided to select the members internally. The final three members, Yebin, Eunice, and Jenny were revealed and the group was set to debut in August under the name DIA. MBK announced a line-up with six members: Eunice, Huihyeon (originally under the stage name Cathy), Jenny, Yebin, Eunjin, and Chaeyeon. Seunghee was added to the line-up before the group's debut. On September 14, 2015, DIA ultimately released their self-titled debut studio album, Do It Amazing.

 2016: Line-up changes, Happy Ending, Spell, and subgroups 
Eunchae (introduced with her real name Chaewon) joined as a new member in March 2016, and in April, Seunghee was confirmed to have left the group. DIA's first mini-album Happy Ending was released on June 14, 2016, along with the music video for lead single "On the Road" on the same day.

In September 2016, the group released a Harry Potter-themed album titled Spell, with "Mr. Potter" as the lead single. DIA was subsequently separated into two "A" and "B" subgroups, named BinChaenHyunSeuS and L.U.B, releasing songs separately.

 2017: New members, YOLO and Love Generation 

On April 6, the group released a pre-release single titled "You Are My Flower", which featured trot singers Kim Yeon-ja and Hong Jin-young. DIA's reality show subsequently began airing on April 9 on the TV network Onstyle, days after two new members, Jueun and Somyi, were announced. On April 19, the group's second studio album YOLO was released. The album contained fourteen tracks, with the lead single titled "Will You Go Out with Me?". YOLO also included several tracks composed by the members themselves and featured various artists such as rapper DinDin and former I.O.I member Kim Chung-ha.

DIA's third mini-album titled Love Generation was later released on August 22, 2017. The album contains twelve tracks, with the lead single titled "Can't Stop". On October 12, a repackaged edition of Love Generation, titled Present, was released. It contained the songs from the former, along with four new songs with the title track "Good Night".

 2018: Eunjin's departure and Summer Ade 

On May 7, 2018, Eunjin announced her departure from the group, citing health problems. On June 9, 2018, it was reported that DIA would make a comeback on July 5, 2018. It had been previously announced that the group were to come back in April with a track produced by Shinsadong Tiger. On the day of the album's purported release, MBK Entertainment released an official statement announcing and apologizing for its postponement saying it was to be released on July 18, but that did not happen, with the company claiming the postponements were to ensure high-quality material. DIA ultimately released on their fourth EP Summer Ade on August 9, 2018, with the title track "Woo Woo". On August 14, the group received their first music show win on SBS MTV's The Show.

 2019–2020: Newtro, Jenny's departure and comeback as a unit with Flower 4 Seasons  
Initially, it was reported that DIA would make a comeback on November 7, 2018, with a "Bo Peep Bo Peep 2.0" produced by Shinsadong Tiger. However, nothing materialized. On February 20, MBK Entertainment confirmed both DIA's comeback and the single would be produced by Shinsadong Tiger and marks their first release as seven members without Jenny due to a knee injury. On March 19, 2019, DIA released their fifth EP titled Newtro alongside its title track "Woowa", after previous reports of a release on March 28 and 21. On July 6, 2019, MBK Entertainment confirmed that Jenny left the group due to health problems with her knee.

On May 25, 2020, it was revealed that DIA would make a comeback with their sixth EP Flower 4 Seasons on June 10, marked their first release under PocketDol Studio.  It was confirmed that the group will promote with five members as a unit without Chaeyeon & Somyi.

On November 12, 2020, it was announced that the group would be making a comeback in January 2021, though it never materialized.

 2022: Somyi's departure, Rooting for You 
On January 9, 2022, PocketDol confirmed that Somyi had terminated her contract and left DIA.

On May 11, 2022, it was announced that DIA will be releasing their final album in August, before the group's contract ends in September. It was later confirmed that the group is preparing for a comeback in August. It would be the last album before the end of the contract, and there were discussions regarding Chaeyeon's participation in the album.

On September 6, 2022, it was announced that DIA will be releasing their final single Rooting for You'' on September 15. Later that day, the release of the single was moved forward to September 14 to coincide with the 7th anniversary of the group's debut. The group was initially scheduled to perform on music programs, but were canceled after member Chaeyeon got injured. Yebin highlighted that despite DIA's contracts expiring, the group would not be disbanding and they would still be a group to promote and release albums together in the near future, albeit the members being under different agencies.

Members 
Adapted from their Naver profile.
 Eunice — vocalist
 Jueun — vocalist
 Huihyeon — leader, rapper
 Yebin — vocalist
 Chaeyeon — vocalist
 Eunchae — vocalist

Former 
 Seunghee — leader, vocalist
 Eunjin — rapper
 Jenny — vocalist
 Somyi — vocalist

Sub-units 
 BinChaenHyunSeuS – Eunice, Huihyeon, Yebin, Chaeyeon
 L.U.B – Jueun, Eunchae

Timeline

Discography

Studio albums

Extended plays

Singles

Collaborations

Soundtrack appearances

Compilation appearances

Videography

Music videos

Awards and nominations

Gaon Chart Music Awards

|-
| 2016
| DIA
| New Artist of the Year
|

Seoul Music Awards

|-
| rowspan="4"|2016
| rowspan="7"|DIA
| Bonsang Award
| 
|-
| New Artist Award
| 
|-
| Popularity Award
| 
|-
| Hallyu Special Award
| 
|-
| rowspan="3"|2018
| Bonsang Award
| 
|-
| Popularity Award
| 
|-
| Hallyu Special Award
| 
|-

Asia Artist Awards

|-
| 2016
| rowspan="2"|DIA
| Most Popular Artist (Singer)
| 
|-
| 2017
| Rising Star Award
|

AfreecaTV BJ Awards

|-
| 2015
| DIA
| Special Idol Awards
|

Korean Culture and Entertainment Awards

|-
| 2016
| DIA
| Kpop Singer Award
|

Soribada Best K-Music Awards

|-
| rowspan="2"| 2017
| rowspan="3"| DIA
| Photogenic Award
| 
|-
| Popularity Award
| 
|-
| 2018
| New Hallyu Performance Award
|

Melon Music Awards

|-
| 2017
| "You Are My Flower" (Hong Jin Young, DIA and Kim Yeon-ja)
| Best Trot
|

Notes

References

External links 

 

K-pop music groups
Musical groups established in 2015
Musical groups disestablished in 2022
2015 establishments in South Korea
South Korean dance music groups
MBK Entertainment artists
South Korean girl groups
Musical groups from Seoul